Ronald or Ron Kennedy may refer to:

Sportspeople
Ron Kennedy (1953–2009), Canadian ice hockey player and trainer
Ron Kennedy (footballer) (1919–2006), Australian rules footballer

Others 
Ronald C. Kennedy, virus immunologist at Texas Tech University
Ron Kennedy (actor) (1931–2010), American voice-over artist and character actor
Ronald Kennedy of the Kennedy Baronets